The Cabinet of Antonis Samaras succeeded the Caretaker Cabinet of Panagiotis Pikrammenos after the repeated legislative elections in May and June 2012. It was sworn in on Thursday, 21 June 2012. The former ministries of Shipping, Tourism and Macedonia and Thrace were re-established. The junior coalition partners, PASOK and DIMAR, chose to take a limited role in the cabinet, preferring to be represented by party officials and independent technocrats instead of MPs. Vassilis Rapanos, the prime minister's first choice for finance minister, fell ill before being sworn in, and tendered his resignation on 25 June. Yannis Stournaras was then chosen as the new finance minister on 26 June, and sworn in on 5 July.

DIMAR left the coalition on 21 June 2013 in protest at the closure of the nation's public broadcaster ERT, leaving Samaras with a slim majority of 153 ND and PASOK MPs combined. The two remaining parties proceeded to negotiate a cabinet reshuffle that resulted in a significantly expanded role for PASOK in the new coalition government. A further reshuffle followed the 2014 European Parliament election.

References

Samaras
Cabinets established in 2012
2012 establishments in Greece
Cabinets disestablished in 2015
2012 in Greek politics
2013 in Greek politics
2014 in Greek politics
2015 in Greek politics
Coalition governments
Greek government-debt crisis
New Democracy (Greece)
PASOK
2015 disestablishments in Greece